Galagama Sri Aththadassi Thera (11 January 1922 – 9 March 2016) was a Sri Lankan Buddhist monk who served as the 21st Mahanayaka of the Asgiriya Chapter of Siyam Nikaya. 
He was appointed on 8 May 2015 following the death of Chief Prelate Most Venerable Udugama Sri Buddharakkitha Thero on 8 April 2015.

The Venerable Thera died aged 94 while receiving treatment at the Intensive Care Unit of the Kandy Hospital. He was hospitalized while in an unconscious state after a fall.

See also
 Siyam Nikaya
 Diyawadana Nilame of Sri Dalada Maligawa, Kandy

References

External links
   An esteemed personality

1922 births
2016 deaths
Theravada Buddhist monks
Sri Lankan Theravada Buddhists
Sri Lankan Buddhist monks
Accidental deaths from falls
Accidental deaths in Sri Lanka
20th-century Buddhist monks
21st-century Buddhist monks